Tag and release is a form of catch and release fishing in which the angler attaches a tag to the fish, records data such as date, time, place, and type of fish on a standardized postcard, and submits this card to a fisheries agency or conservation organization. Anglers who catch tagged fish report their location, date, and time, as well as the tag number to established points of contact. South Carolina has had such a program since 1974.

A tag and release program is in place in NSW, Australia.

See also

References

External links
 South Carolina Marine Game Fish Tagging Program
 Southern California Marlin Online Tag and Release Program
 Billfish Database and the Cooperative Marine Game Fish Tagging Program
 The Billfish Foundation (TBF), 2008 Tag and Release Awards Ceremony
 Oceanographic Research Institute (ORI) is a division of the South African Association for Marine Biological Research (SAAMBR)
 The Oio Tagging Project, Hawaiian bonefish Tagging Program

Wild animals identification
Fishing techniques and methods